Chris Tebbetts is an author who grew up in Yellow Springs, Ohio. He currently lives in Vermont. He is known for co-authoring the Middle School series with James Patterson.

Bibliography
Me Myself & Him (2019) 
M or F? with Lisa Papademetriou (2005) 
Middle School: The Worst Years of My Life with James Patterson and Laura Park (2011)
Middle School: Get Me Out of Here with James Patterson and Laura Park (2012)
Middle School: How I Survived Bullies, Broccoli, and Snake Hill
Middle School: Save Rafe! with James Patterson
Middle School: Hero to Zero with James Patterson
Middle School: Just My Rotten Luck with James Patterson
Middle School: Master of Disaster with James Patterson
Public School Superhero with James Patterson
Stranded with Jeff Probst
Stranded: Trial By Fire with Jeff Probst
Stranded: Survivors with Jeff Probst
Stranded Shadow Island: Forbidden Passage with Jeff Probst
Stranded Shadow Island: The Sabotage with Jeff Probst
Stranded Shadow Island: Desperate Measures with Jeff Probst
The Viking, Saga One: Viking Pride
The Viking, Saga Two: Quest for Faith
The Viking, Saga Three: Land of the Dead
The Viking, Saga Four: Hammer of the Gods

References

Living people
Year of birth missing (living people)
Writers from Vermont
Place of birth missing (living people)
Writers from Ohio
People from Yellow Springs, Ohio
American male writers